Bocquillonia castaneifolia is a species of plant in the family Euphorbiaceae. It is endemic to New Caledonia.

References

castaneifolia
Endemic flora of New Caledonia
Taxonomy articles created by Polbot

Critically endangered flora of Oceania